Capra is a genus of mammals, the goats, composed of up to nine species, including the markhor and many species known as ibexes. The domestic goat (Capra hircus) is a domesticated species derived from the wild goat (Capra aegagrus). Evidence of goat domestication dates back more than 8,500 years.

Wild goats are animals of mountain habitats. They are very agile and hardy, able to climb on bare rock and survive on sparse vegetation. They can be distinguished from the genus Ovis, which includes sheep, by the presence of scent glands close to the feet, in the groin, and in front of the eyes, and the absence of other facial glands, and by the presence of a beard in some specimens, and of hairless calluses on the knees of the forelegs.

The Rocky Mountain goat is in a separate genus, Oreamnos. Present-day genetic and phenotypic differences between the Capra species are largely related to (1) discontinuity of and impeded migration between Capra populations during glacial periods, and (2) insufficient time in the postglacial period for now-adjoining Capra populations to overcome behavioral mechanisms impeding hybridization in the wild so as to erase these differences.

Taxonomy

All members of the genus Capra are bovids (members of the family Bovidae), and more specifically caprines (subfamily Caprinae). As such they are ruminants, meaning they chew the cud, and have four-chambered stomachs which play a vital role in digesting, regurgitating, and redigesting their food.

The genus has sometimes been taken to include Ovis (sheep) and Ammotragus (Barbary sheep), but these are usually regarded as distinct genera, leaving Capra for ibexes. In this smaller genus, some authors have recognized only two species, the markhor on one side and all other forms included in one species on the other side. Today, nine species are usually accepted:
 West Asian ibex (Capra aegagrus)
 Bezoar ibex (Capra aegagrus aegagrus)
Sindh ibex (Capra aegagrus blythi)
West Caucasian tur (Capra caucasica)
 East Caucasian tur (Capra cylindricornis)
 Markhor (Capra falconeri)
Domestic goat (Capra hircus; includes feral goat, sometimes considered a subspecies of C. aegagrus)
 Alpine ibex (Capra ibex)
 Nubian ibex (Capra nubiana)
 Spanish ibex (Capra pyrenaica)
 Siberian ibex (Capra sibirica)
 Walia ibex (Capra walie)

The goats of the genus Capra have complex systematic relationships, which are still not completely resolved. Recent studies based on mitochondrial DNA suggest that the Siberian ibex and the Nubian ibex represent distinct species, which are not very closely related to the physically similar Alpine ibex. The Alpine ibex forms a group with the Spanish ibex. The West Caucasian tur appears to be more closely related to the wild goat than to the East Caucasian tur. The markhor is relatively little separated from other forms—previously it had been considered to be a separate branch of the genus.

Almost all wild goat species are allopatric (geographically separated)—the only geographical overlaps are the wild goat (Capra hircus) with the East Caucasian tur (Capra caucasica cylindricornis), and the markhor (Capra falconeri) with the Siberian ibex (Capra siberica). In both cases, the overlapping species do not usually interbreed in the wild, but in captivity, all Capra species can interbreed, producing fertile offspring.

Species and subspecies

Domestication and uses

Along with sheep, goats were among the first domesticated animals. The domestication process started at least 10,000 years ago in what is now northern Iran. Easy human access to goat hair, meat, and milk were the primary motivations. Goat skins were popularly used until the Middle Ages for water and wine bottles when traveling and camping, and in certain regions as parchment for writing.

References

External links

 

 
Goats
Mammals of Asia
Mammals of Africa
Mammal genera
Extant Pleistocene first appearances
Taxa named by Carl Linnaeus